2984 Chaucer, provisionally designated , is a main-belt asteroid, which was discovered by American astronomer Edward Bowell at Lowell's Anderson Mesa Station in Flagstaff, Arizona, on 30 December 1981.

It is named after Geoffrey Chaucer (1343–1400), the medieval English poet.

References

External links 
 Dictionary of Minor Planet Names, Google books
 
 

002984
Chaucer
Named minor planets
19811230